GA Drilling (former Geothermal Anywhere) is a drilling and geothermal energy company headquartered in Bratislava, Slovakia with branches in Bristol (UK), Abu Dhabi (UAE), and Houston (USA). The company was founded in 1994 and rebranded as GA Drilling in August 2013. GA Drilling is also active within the drilling community through participation in several industry events.

Patent portfolio

GA Drilling owns 23+ intellectual property rights (IPR‘s) for technologies in the deep drilling and material disintegration in distinct patent zones (Patents were issued by the US Patent and Trademark Office, European Patent Office, na d Intellectual Property Office of Slovak Republic)

Partner network

R&D network 

GA Drilling has created or is a co-founder of the network of technology organizations in the European Union, mainly in the Central European region. Its partner network consists of Slovak (Slovak University of Technology, University of Zilina, Comenius University, institutes of the Slovak Academy of Sciences) and European organisations (Weatherford UK Ltd, Imerys, EGS Energy, Altus Intervention UK). GA Drilling is also a member of European Geothermal Energy Council (EGEC), European Technology Platform on Renewable Heating and Cooling (ETP-RHC), East of England Energy Group (EEEGR), Energy Industries Council (EIC), as well as European Technology Platform on Sustainable Mineral Resources (ETP-SMR).

Agreement with Schoeller-Bleckmann 

In July 2013, GA Drilling announced that it has concluded a technology development and strategic investment agreement with Schoeller-Bleckmann Oilfield Equipment, a maker of components for the oil service industry. The partnership is focused on the development of PLASMABIT technology and meeting major challenges of the drilling industry. This partnership ensures component supplies are manufactured by SBO and allows GA Drilling to further develop its patented PLASMABIT technology. Investment supports the completion of 3rd generation of plasma disintegration devices and test-rig construction for drilling at deeper depths.

GA Drilling Technology Center

On 11 October 2012, GA Drilling established GA Drilling Technology Center in Bratislava, Slovakia. The previous laboratory — Research Centre for Deep Drilling - was established On November 10, 2010, by Geothermal Anywhere on the premises of the Slovak Academy of Sciences.

See also
Plasma deep drilling technology

References

Drilling technology
Oil wells
Technology companies of Slovakia
Geothermal drilling
Geothermal energy
Mining engineering companies
Companies based in Bratislava
Slovak brands